Herring Burl "H. B." Bailey (November 15, 1936 – April 17, 2003) was a NASCAR driver. He raced his No. 36 Pontiac part-time as an independent driver in the Grand National/Winston Cup series from 1962 to 1993, making 85 races over his career.

Although he never ran a full schedule, he still had his share of fans. He had the distinction of being the first driver to take a qualifying lap for the inaugural Brickyard 400 in 1994.

Bailey said he began racing at Playland Park, near Houston, in 1954. He won the track championship there in 1959.

Darlington Raceway was one of the driver's favorite venues, and he was a three-time member of the UNOCAL/Darlington Record Club at the famed South Carolina oval. Bailey made his final start in the 1993 Southern 500 at Darlington.

In the 1972 NASCAR Grand American division, Bailey won the pole for the opener at Daytona International Speedway, won at Nashville and finished second in the national championship standings to Wayne Andrews.

He died of heart failure on April 17, 2003.  When he died, Richard Petty, who raced alongside Bailey for virtually his entire career, said "Our sport was built by people like H.B. Bailey", adding "H.B. was a racer through and through, and the sport is better off because he was a part of it. We will miss him."

Bailey's son and mechanic on his cars, Joe Dan, later worked as an engineer for various NASCAR teams, including Bob Whitcomb's 1990 Daytona 500-winning team and the Richard Childress Racing 1993 and 1994 NASCAR Cup Series championship teams.

Motorsports career results

NASCAR
(key) (Bold – Pole position awarded by qualifying time. Italics – Pole position earned by points standings or practice time. * – Most laps led.)

Grand National Series

Winston Cup Series

Daytona 500

Winston West Series

ARCA Bondo/Mar-Hyde Series
(key) (Bold – Pole position awarded by qualifying time. Italics – Pole position earned by points standings or practice time. * – Most laps led.)

References

External links
 

1936 births
2003 deaths
Lamar High School (Houston, Texas) alumni
NASCAR drivers
NASCAR team owners
Racing drivers from Houston
ARCA Menards Series drivers